Michael David Poole (born 23 April 1955) is an English retired football goalkeeper who played professionally in The Football League, North American Soccer League and Major Indoor Soccer League.

Poole began his career with Rochdale A.F.C.  In 1974, the team sent the nineteen-year-old Poole on loan with the Denver Dynamos of the North American Soccer League. In 1977, they Rochdale loaned him to the Portland Timbers of the NASL before selling him to the Timbers in 1978. Poole played for the Timbers from 1978 to 1980. In the fall of 1979, he joined the Houston Summit of the Major Indoor Soccer League. In 1980, the NASL ran an indoor season and Poole began the indoor season with the Timbers before moving to the Baltimore Blast of the MISL for the end of the season. He returned to Rochdale in 1981.

External links
NASL/MISL stats

References

1955 births
Living people
Baltimore Blast (1980–1992) players
Denver Dynamos players
English footballers
English expatriate footballers
Houston Summit players
Major Indoor Soccer League (1978–1992) players
North American Soccer League (1968–1984) indoor players
North American Soccer League (1968–1984) players
Portland Timbers (1975–1982) players
Rochdale A.F.C. players
Association football goalkeepers
English expatriate sportspeople in the United States
Expatriate soccer players in the United States